Love Streams is the eighth studio album by Canadian electronic music musician Tim Hecker, released on April 8, 2016 on 4AD and Paper Bag Records. The album was recorded throughout 2014 and 2015 at Greenhouse Studios in Reykjavík, Iceland, where parts of Hecker's last two albums Virgins (2013) and Ravedeath, 1972 (2011) were recorded.

Background and recording
The album features Kara-Lis Coverdale and Grímur Helgason, who were both collaborators on Hecker's last album Virgins, as well as contributions from the Icelandic Choir Ensemble, whose vocal arrangements were scored by Icelandic composer Jóhann Jóhannsson. Hecker professed to having thought about ideas like "liturgical aesthetics after Yeezus" and the "transcendental voice in the age of auto-tune" during its creation.

Critical reception

Love Streams received universal acclaim from critics. On the aggregate score site Metacritic, the album scored at 82 out of 100, indicating "universal acclaim". Pitchfork wrote that "Love Streams marks a subtle shift in Tim Hecker's habitual style, a pivot away from his hazy trademark." PopMatters gave the album nine stars out of ten, stating that "Love Streams is at once familiar and totally alien; a work of art that reminds us why we need art in the first place."

Accolades

Track listing

Personnel
 Jóhann Jóhannsson – choral arrangement
 Icelandic Choir Ensemble – choir
 Owen Roberts – choir conductor
 Ben Frost – studio engineering, additional choral production
 Kara-Lis Coverdale – keyboards
 Paul Corley – additional mixing
 Grímur Helgason – woodwind

Charts

References 

Tim Hecker albums
2016 albums
4AD albums
Paper Bag Records albums